2013–14 Syed Mushtaq Ali Trophy was the sixth edition of the Syed Mushtaq Ali Trophy competition, an Indian domestic team only Twenty20 cricket tournament in India. It was contested by 27 teams. Baroda emerged as winners of the tournament.

Squads
The squads details of all the 27 participating teams is present here

Group stage

West Zone

Central Zone

South Zone

East Zone

North Zone

Super League Stage

Group A

Group B

Final

References

External links
 Series home at ESPN Cricinfo

Syed Mushtaq Ali Trophy
Syed Mushtaq Ali Trophy